Lonesome may refer to:
 Lonesome (1928 film), an American comedy drama part-talkie film
 Lonesome (2022 film), an Australian drama film
 Loneliness, the emotion
 "Lonesome", a song by Unwritten Law from the album Unwritten Law
 "Lonesome", a song by Shaed